Outgrow is the fourth Japanese studio album (ninth overall) by South Korean singer BoA. It was released on February 15, 2006, and features the singles "Do the Motion", "Make a Secret", "Dakishimeru", and "Everlasting". The album also features the track "First Snow" from BoA's special digital single, "Merry Christmas from BoA". Several of the album's songs have either been written or composed by BoA herself.

The album comes in two editions, a limited CD+DVD edition, and a regular (unlimited) CD-only edition. Both editions come with different covers (as shown on the table on the right), and the CD features 13 tracks, including a bonus track of "First Snow" alongside 5 new songs. The limited edition CD+DVD version includes a DVD with 5 video clips (4 of which are of all of the music videos from the featured singles and an additional special "behind the scenes" clip).

Track listing

CD
 "Silent Screamerz" (3:30)
 "Do the Motion" (4:14)
 "Kimi no tonari de (キミのとなりで)" (5:09)
 "Outgrow: Ready Butterfly" (3:20)
 "Make a Secret" (4:48)
 "Everlasting" (5:25)
 "Long Time No See" (3:56)
 "Cosmic Eyes" (3:40)
 "Dakishimeru (抱きしめる)" (3:48)
 "Love Is Just What You Can't See" (5:06)
 "Stay My Gold" (5:30)
 "Soundscape" (4:11)
 "With U" (3:42)
 "First Snow (Bonus Track)" (4:23)

DVD
 "Do the Motion" (video clip)
 "Make a Secret" (video clip)
 "Dakishimeru" (video clip)
 "Everlasting" (video clip)
 Making of Music Videos + Bonus Video Clip

Charts

Weekly charts

Year-end charts

Sales and certifications

Singles

References

2006 albums
BoA albums
Avex Group albums
2006 video albums
Avex Group video albums